Frédéric Mendy (born 29 November 1973) is a French former professional footballer who played as a defender. He played 339 matches in Ligue 1 and Ligue 2 for FC Martigues, SC Bastia and Montpellier HSC between 1993 and 2007.

Managerial career
In 2019, Mendy was appointed manager of the Montpellier women's team.

Personal life
Mendy was born in France, and is of Senegalese descent.  When David Ginola collapsed during a charity football match in 2016, Mendy performed cardiopulmonary resuscitation (CPR), which cardiac surgeon Gilles Dreyfus claimed saved Ginola from death or at the least permanent brain damage.

References

External links
 

1973 births
Living people
Footballers from Marseille
Association football defenders
French footballers
French sportspeople of Senegalese descent
French beach soccer players
FC Martigues players
SC Bastia players
Montpellier HSC players
Black French sportspeople